Maiestas dex is a species of bug from the Cicadellidae family that is endemic to Liberia. It was formerly placed within Recilia, but a 2009 revision moved it to Maiestas.

References

Endemic fauna of Liberia
Insects of West Africa
Maiestas